Platypolia anceps is a species of cutworm or dart moth in the family Noctuidae. It is found in North America.

The MONA or Hodges number for Platypolia anceps is 9976.

References

Further reading

External links

 

Xylenini
Articles created by Qbugbot
Moths described in 1850